The 1816 New York gubernatorial election was held in April 1816 to elect the Governor and Lieutenant Governor of New York.  Governor Tompkins had received the nomination of the Congressional Caucus for Vice President as James Monroe's running-mate. Senator King would receive the votes for President of those Federalist Electors chosen that fall.

Candidates
The Democratic-Republican Party nominated incumbent Daniel D. Tompkins. They nominated incumbent John Tayler for Lieutenant Governor.

The Federalist Party nominated U.S. senator Rufus King. They nominated state senator George Tibbits for Lieutenant Governor.

Results
The Democratic-Republican ticket of Tompkins and Tayler was elected.

Sources
Result: The Tribune Almanac 1841

See also
New York gubernatorial elections
New York state elections

1816
Gubernatorial
New York
April 1816 events